Kamal Dib (Arabic: كمال ديب), a Canadian-Lebanese scholar and professor of political and economic studies. He has published more than 13 books on economic and social issues of the Arab countries and Canada and has published hundreds of research and studies in economic. He is a professor of economics at the University of Ottawa and Algonquin College.

Education and career 
Kamal Dib was born in Lebanon and moved to Canada at the age of sixteen. He graduated from the University of Ottawa with a bachelor's degree in German Language and Literature. He has also earned a master's degree in International Development from the Norman Paterson School of International Affairs for Graduate Studies in Ottawa, a postgraduate Diploma in Economic Development from Ottawa university, a second master's degree in theoretical economic and a PhD in economics from the same university. Dib is a member of the following: Arab and German Culture Association, International Metropolis Project Committee for Immigration and Pluralism Affairs, and the Canadian Economic Experts Association.

Dib has worked as a director of economic and social research in the Canadian government for fifteen years, then worked in the Ministry of Finance in Canada in public debt affairs. He currently hold the position of Chief Economist in the Canadian government and Head of the Center for Social and Economic Research and Cultural Studies in Canada. He also works as a professor in economics at the University of Ottawa and Algonquin College. Dib has published his first book "Labor Supply in the UN ESCWA Region" in 1995. He has many publications about the economic situation in many Arab countries, including Iraq as in his book "A Summary of the History of Iraq", Syria "Contemporary History of Syria from the French Mandate to the Summer", Lebanon "Warlords and Temple Traders Hidden Men Power and Money in Lebanon", and Canada in his book "Public Pension in Canada". He has published more than 13 books on economic and social situation and issues, in addition to numerous studies and research on financial crises and cultural activities, most of which have been published in An-Nahar newspaper.

Works 
Some of his works include the followings:

 Labor Supply in the UN ESCWA Region, 1995
 Public Pensions in Canada, 1998
 The Human and Physical cost of War in Lebanon, 2001
 Employment Equity in Canada 2003. 
 Warlords and Merchants, 2004
 Youssef Bedas Intra Empire and Money Sharks in Lebanon Volume 1 (2015 al-Maktaba al-Sharquiya Librairie Orientale)
 Roger Tamraz Intra Empire and Money Sharks in Lebanon Volume 2 (2017, al-Maktaba al-Sharquiya Librairie Orientale)
 Rafic Hariri  Intra Empire and Money Sharks in Lebanon Volume 3 (2020, al-Maktaba al-Sharquiya Librairie Orientale)
 Syria in History Souria fi al-Tarikh  (2016, al-Maktaba al-Sharquiya Librairie Orientale) 
 Magdala Lebanese Novel   (2019, al-Maktaba al-Sharquiya Librairie Orientale) 
 Histoire Culturelle du Liban (Tarikh Lubnan al Thakafi)  (2018, al-Maktaba al-Sharquiya Librairie Orientale) 
 Un précis de l'histoire de l'Irak (Mojaz Tarikh al-Iraq) (Dar-Farabi, 2013)
 The Curse of Cain Natural Gaz Wars in Russia, Iran, Qatar Lebanon and Syria (La'nat Qayin: Houroub al-Ghaz) Dar al-Farabi 2018.
 Coming out soon:Presidents and Crisis: from Charles Debbas to Michel Aoun (Ohoud wa Azamat), Beirut, Dar Annahar, 2022.
 Coming out soon: Predator Neoliberalism: The Predicament of Lebanon from the Intra Crisis 1966 to 2022, Dar Annahar, 2022.
 Coming out soon: Angela: from East Beirut to West Berlin (Novel), Beirut, Dar Annahar, 2022.

References 

Lebanese writers
Lebanese scholars
Canadian non-fiction writers
University of Ottawa alumni
Year of birth missing (living people)
Living people